Alejandro González Trujillo (born February 24, 1969, Miami, Florida, United States) is an American musician of Cuban and Colombian extraction. He is a member, drummer and songwriter for the Mexican band Maná and metal band De La Tierra. He is nicknamed "El Animal" and has sung lead vocals on several songs, such as "Me Vale". Alex discovered his passion for playing the drums at the young age of 5 when he caught the attention of a kindergarten teacher who gave him a red sparkle drumkit. He took to the instrument very seriously and found himself a teacher shortly thereafter.

Alex was in Maná by age fifteen which hit it big in 1992 with the album ¿Dónde Jugarán Los Niños?, which was certified gold in the U.S. Alex cites influences such as Ringo Starr, John Bonham, Keith Moon, Stewart Copeland, Neil Peart and Terry Bozzio.

Maná has been a big part of the Rock En Español phenomenon in the United States. They began playing in the United States in 1993 and influenced other bands with their success to play in the U.S., too. Alex is quoted as saying, "I think it’s incredible that Spanish language bands like ours can sell millions of albums and sell out arenas in the U.S. It’s also cool to see how many “anglos” are now getting hooked on our music." His talent has been featured in Modern Drummer Magazine, Drummerworld, Drum, among others. He performs exclusively with DW Drums (formerly has used Pearl Drums), Remo, Paiste and Vic Firth.

References

External links
 Alex Gonzalez on Drum Channel

1969 births
Living people
Mexican drummers
Mexican male musicians
Male drummers
American rock drummers
American entertainers of Cuban descent
American people of Colombian descent
American expatriates in Mexico
Maná members
Latin Grammy Award winners
Latin Recording Academy Person of the Year honorees
20th-century American drummers
American male drummers
De La Tierra members